Lincoln Middle School is a middle school in the Deering Center neighborhood of Portland, Maine. The school is located on Stevens Avenue, which has the unusual distinction of having an elementary school, middle school, two high schools, and a college all situated on it.  The new principal of the school as of the 2014–2015 school year is Suellyn Santiago who was the assistant principal and a math teacher previously.  Lincoln Middle school is divided into houses, 2 for each grade (6,7,8).  The students at Lincoln primarily come from three of Portland's many elementary schools, Riverton, Hall, and Longfellow, which is also located on Stevens Avenue.  The mascot of Lincoln Middle School is the Lion.

History
Lincoln Middle School was erected in 1897 and opened in 1899 as Deering High School.  In 1913 an annex of 18 classrooms was added to the structure due to the increasing number of students enrolling in Deering High School.  On May 21, 1921 a fire broke out in the Library of Deering High School. During the fire, Captain James C. Kent was killed when the roof collapsed upon him.  He died later of internal injuries.  The school was rebuilt that year.  In 1923 the student body overpopulated Deering so a new Deering High School was built further down Stevens Avenue and the current Deering High School became Deering Junior High.  In 1925 Deering decided to change its name and rename it in honor of the 16th President, Abraham Lincoln, so Deering Junior High became Lincoln Junior High School.  In 1962 a gymnasium was added to Lincoln in honor of Joseph J. Wagnis, who lost his life while fishing on Sebago Lake. The name of the school was changed to Lincoln Middle School in 1979. In 1994–1995 Lincoln Middle School was renovated and was reopened in 1996.  During the two years of the renovation, students attended school at the Stevens Avenue Armory, about .5 mile away.

Geodesic dome
In 2007, eighth graders at Lincoln Middle School built a geodesic dome where the modulars had previously been located. This dome is used as a "self sustaining living classroom", meaning that it provides itself with all of its energy needs. It includes solar panels, raised outdoor planting beds and a second floor greenhouse.

Demographics
As of 2011, Lincoln's racial demographics closely mirrored nearby Deering High School; 65.5 percent white, 16.5 percent black, 13 percent Asian and 5 percent Hispanic students.

Notes 

Public middle schools in Maine
Schools in Portland, Maine
School buildings completed in 1897
1897 establishments in Maine